The She-Wolf (Spanish: La Loba, or Los Horrores del Bosque Negro) is a 1965 Mexican horror film directed by Rafael Baledón and starring Kitty de Hoyos as a female werewolf.

Plot

A young attractive woman  from a rich Mexican family is under a curse that causes her to transform into a wolf-woman at night and kill people. She falls in love with the doctor she sees (in order to get cured from her curse) who is also a werewolf. Unfortunately for both, their love-filled killing spree comes to an end when they are killed by a trained, werewolf-killing dog.

Cast
Kitty de Hoyos as Clarisa Fernandez
Joaquín Cordero as Dr. Alejandro Bernstein
Columba Domínguez Marcela de Fernandez
José Elías Moreno as Professor Fernandez

Reception

Dave Sindelar from Fantastic Movie Musings and Ramblings called it "one of the more impressive Mexican horror films":, praising the film's atmosphere, attack sequences, and make-up effects.

References

External links
 
 
 

1965 films
Mexican black-and-white films
Columbia Pictures films
1965 horror films
1960s Spanish-language films
Mexican werewolf films
1960s Mexican films